The Conception of My Younger Brother is a 2000 Czech drama film directed by Vladimír Drha. It was entered into the 22nd Moscow International Film Festival.

Cast
 Dana Vávrová as Marie
 Jirí Bartoska as Josef Plachý
 Vladimír Dlouhý
 Miroslav Ballek as Tonda
 Jana Brejchová
 Marie Durnová as Zdena Plachá
 Antonie Hegerlíková
 Jirí Hálek
 Jirí Hána as Bridegroom
Martha Issová
Vítezslav Jandák as Narrator
Jitka Jezková as Bride
Jaroslava Obermaierová
Filip Rajmont as Postman
František Řehák
Miroslav Simunek
Jirí Sláma
Lenka Termerová

References

External links
 

2000 films
2000 drama films
2000s Czech-language films
Czech drama films
2000s Czech films